Prazeres is a former civil parish (freguesia) in the city and municipality of Lisbon, Portugal. At the administrative reorganization of Lisbon on 8 December 2012 it became part of the parish Estrela.

Main sites
Prazeres Cemetery
São Francisco de Paula Church
Palace of Necessidades

References 

Former parishes of Lisbon